Ulsza is a village in the administrative district of Gmina Strzelin, within Strzelin County, Lower Silesian Voivodeship, in south-western Poland. Prior to 1945 it was in Germany. On 1 January 2019, the official name of the village was changed from Ulica to Ulsza.

References

Ulica